Patrick Harran (born 13 July 1969) is an American organic chemist who has held the D. J. & J. M. Cram Chair in Organic Chemistry, an endowed chair at the University of California, Los Angeles, since 2008. Prior to taking this position he was a professor at the University of Texas Southwestern Medical Center. Harran was educated at Skidmore College graduating in 1990. He went on to Yale University, where he was awarded a Ph.D. in 1995.

In 2009, a research assistant in his lab, Sheri Sangji, died from burn injuries after a chemical fire. A California Division of Occupational Safety and Health report faulted Harran for willfully neglecting safety protocols. He was charged with four felony counts in the first criminal case stemming from a laboratory accident in U.S. history, but avoided jailtime through a plea deal with prosecutors, which was finalized in 2018.  In 2015, the AAAS Chemistry Section nominated, but then did not proceed with the nomination of Harran for AAAS Fellow, after concerns about the Sangji case were raised by the ACS Committee on Chemical Safety.

Research
Harran's research is focused on the total synthesis of natural products, design of novel chemical compounds to study protein–protein interactions, and medicinal chemistry.

Awards and honors 
 J. Clarence Karcher Medal, University of Oklahoma, 17 March 2017
 Hanson-Dow Award for Excellence in Teaching, 2013
 Glenn T. Seaborg Award - Alpha Chi Sigma, 2009
 Norman Hackerman Prize of the Robert A. Welch Foundation, 2007
 E. Bright Wilson Prize - Harvard University, 2005
 Merck Research Laboratories Chemistry Council Award, 2005-2007
 Mar Nell and F. Andrew Bell Distinguished Chair, 2005
 Pfizer Award for Creativity in Organic Synthesis, 2003
 Distinguished Alumni Award, Skidmore College, 2003
 Eli Lilly Grantee, 2003-2004
 AstraZeneca Excellence in Chemistry Award, 2002
 Alfred P. Sloan Research Fellow, 2002-2004
 National Science Foundation CAREER Award, 2000-2004
 National Research Service Award, Stanford University, 1995-1997
 Bristol-Myers Squibb Research Fellow, Yale University, 1993
 American Institute of Chemists Award, Skidmore College, 1990
 Highest Departmental Honors in Chemistry, Skidmore College, 1990
 One Year Advanced Admission, Skidmore College, 1986

Laboratory fire

On December 29, 2008, a fire in Harran's UCLA laboratory fatally burned research assistant Sheri Sangji. Harran in 2011 was charged with four felony counts of willfully violating occupational safety standards in the case, carrying a maximum jail term of 4.5 years. It was the first time any American academic had been criminally charged for a laboratory accident. Representatives of Harran, and the university's Board of Regents who were also charged in the incident, disputed the charges.

Harran and prosecutors in 2014 reached a deferred prosecution agreement in which Harran was ordered to pay $10,000 to a local burn center and do 800 hours of community service. Deputy District Attorney Craig W. Hum said that the penalty was similar to any sentence Harran would have received if convicted, while Sangji's family criticized it as "barely a slap on the wrist". The charges were subsequently dropped in 2018, in accordance with the settlement terms.

References

1969 births
Living people
21st-century American chemists
University of Texas faculty
University of California, Los Angeles faculty
Skidmore College alumni